Swan Creek is a stream in Osage County in Missouri. It is a tributary of the Gasconade River.

The stream source arises on the southeast side of Pea Ridge and Missouri Route U and south of Linn. The stream flows southeast passing under Missouri Route 89 just prior to entering a sharp meander of the Gasconade. The community of Rich Fountain lies to the west of the confluence on Brush Creek.

Swan Creek was named for the fact swans frequented a lake near its course.

See also
List of rivers of Missouri

References

Rivers of Osage County, Missouri
Rivers of Missouri
Tributaries of the Gasconade River